Robbinson Lantz Crosby (August 4, 1959 – June 6, 2002) was an American guitarist who was a member of glam metal band Ratt, earning several platinum albums in the US in the 1980s. Crosby died in 2002 from a heroin overdose.

Early life
Crosby was born in La Jolla, California, and had two sisters, Ristin and Bronle.  Robbin attended Bird Rock Elementary, Muirlands Junior High and La Jolla High School.  He previously played baseball prior to shifting his focus to the guitar. He was the son of Harry W. Crosby, a science schoolteacher at La Jolla High and an author of books about California history.

Career

Before Ratt
In the late 1970s, Crosby played in the San Diego band Mac Meda. In 1980, Crosby was in the band Phenomenon, which also featured future Warrior member Parramore McCarty, and released one single. The same year he also recorded a live demo with the band Aircraft, which also featured Rob Lamothe, later in Riverdogs with Dio/Whitesnake/Def Leppard guitarist Vivian Campbell.

With Ratt
Crosby was one of the original members of the San Diego rock band Mickey Ratt, later to be rechristened simply Ratt. He would end up co-writing many of Ratt's songs including "Round and Round", "Wanted Man" and "Lay It Down". The album Out of the Cellar went to triple platinum based on "Round and Round".

Crosby was dating actress Tawny Kitaen at the time he joined Ratt, and she appears on the album covers of both the Ratt EP (1983) and Out of the Cellar (1984).

In the coming years, Crosby would buy a home in the Hollywood Hills of Los Angeles. He later married Playboy Playmate Laurie Carr in 1987, eventually divorcing in 1991. They had no children.

After Ratt
Crosby eventually left Ratt. Prior to leaving, Crosby worked as a producer for metal band Lillian Axe.

In a June 1999 interview for a Ratt episode of VH1's Behind the Music, Crosby talked about how drug addiction and his HIV status changed his life. "What has drug addiction done for me?" he asked. "It's cost me my career, my fortune, basically my sex life when I found out I was HIV positive."

In 2001, Crosby publicly stated that he had AIDS and had been HIV positive since 1994. He had also been in and out of the hospital for eight years dealing with back problems and health issues associated with HIV. To occupy his time he became a Little League coach, and also worked on a guitar fan/collector project, which was to create a limited-edition run of Jackson King V "Big Red" replica guitars.

Crosby also attempted various musical projects, first (post-Ratt) re-uniting with Perry McCarty, Krys Baratto, Dino Guerrero and Mark Lewis as an updated version of Secret Service, a moniker used by McCarty and Crosby previously for their pre-Ratt San Diego band. Later moving to El Paso in 1996, he briefly played with the Country/Western group Bill&Kev&War Party. One of his last projects was with former collaborator and ex-Ratt bassist Juan Croucier.

Death
Crosby died in Los Angeles on June 6, 2002. Although his death was reported to be from complications from AIDS, he actually died of a heroin overdose (although he had also previously tested positive for the AIDS virus).

At the time of his death, Crosby had changed physically, due to a pancreatic condition that altered his metabolism; Crosby had gained significant weight since his 1980s Ratt heyday. He was quoted as saying in an interview just before his death, "Apparently my pancreas has given up and I'm not metabolizing food the way I should. It's real frustrating.... I have a roommate that probably weighs 150 lbs. and he eats a lot more than I do. It's not like I'm a pig or a slob."

In a 1999 interview that was first televised in 2006, when Ratt's Behind the Music episode finally aired, Crosby stated, "When I die, nobody cry at my funeral, in fact let's all have a party; I've lived the life of ten men. I lived all my dreams and more."

Crosby's remains were cremated. His memorial was at Windansea Beach in La Jolla, California; friends and family on surfboards spread his ashes out at sea.

Discography

With Ratt
Ratt EP (1983)
Out of the Cellar (1984)
Invasion of Your Privacy (1985)
Dancing Undercover (1986)
Reach for the Sky (1988)
Detonator (1990)
Ratt & Roll 81-91 (1991)

With Jon Bon Jovi
Blaze of Glory (1990)

With Rumbledog
Rumbledog (1993)

References

External links

 

1959 births
2002 deaths
20th-century American musicians
AIDS-related deaths in California
American male guitarists
American rock guitarists
Deaths by heroin overdose in California
Lead guitarists
Ratt members
People from La Jolla, San Diego
People with HIV/AIDS
20th-century American guitarists
20th-century American male musicians